Musa maclayi is a species of seeded banana native to Papua New Guinea and the Solomon Islands. It is placed in section Callimusa (now including the former section Australimusa). It is regarded as one of the progenitors of the Fe'i banana cultivars.

The plant has red sap and an upright flowering and fruiting stem. The fruits are rounded and arranged closely together in bunches – partly joined along their edges in some varieties.

The species was named after the explorer and naturalist Nicholas Miklouho-Maclay, who first described it:

Subspecies 
Two subspecies and two varieties are known:
 Musa maclayi subsp. ailuluai Argent
 Musa maclayi subsp. maclayi (autonym)
 Musa maclayi var. erecta (Simmonds) Argent
 Musa maclayi var. namatani Argent

Notes and references 

maclayi
Plants described in 1885
Flora of Papuasia